The C12A1 cadet target rifle is a competition firearm used by members of the Royal Canadian Army Cadets for advanced training and target shooting competition.

The C12A1 cadet rifle is a single-shot, bolt-action rifle chambered in 7.62×51mm NATO. It features a heavy, match-grade free-floating barrel and an ejector. The rifle was designed around the action of the RPA Quadlock rifle system.  The rifle is equipped with a synthetic Robertson pistol-grip stock with adjustable cheekpiece and buttplate.  The standard issue C12A1 also features German-made closed aperture sights and has a level on the front sight. The C12A1 fires a 7.62×51mm NATO round, also known commonly as the 308 Winchester, the same round used in many common hunting and sporting rifles. It has no applied safety.

The National Rifle Team (NRT) and cadets taking the Fullbore Phase 2 summer training course (formerly Cadet Leader Instructor Marksman Course) use this rifle. The stock of the NRT variation is decorated with maple leaves and painted red for use at the annual Bisley shooting competition in the United Kingdom.

See also 
 Diemaco C11
 Royal Canadian Army Cadets
 RPA Rangemaster, another rifle also produced by RPA International

References
 Connaught National Army Cadet Summer Training Centre

Bolt-action rifles of Canada
Single-shot bolt-action rifles